Tom Campbell (July 20, 1898 – May 30, 1971) was an American middle-distance runner. He competed in the men's 800 metres at the 1920 Summer Olympics.

References

External links
 

1898 births
1971 deaths
Athletes (track and field) at the 1920 Summer Olympics
American male middle-distance runners
Olympic track and field athletes of the United States
Yale Bulldogs men's track and field athletes
Track and field athletes from South Carolina
People from St. Stephen, South Carolina